Hans Hermann Ludwig von Reuter (9 February 1869 – 18 December 1943) was a German admiral who commanded the High Seas Fleet when it was interned at Scapa Flow in the north of Scotland at the end of World War I. On 21 June 1919 he ordered the scuttling of the German fleet in Scapa Flow to prevent the UK from seizing the ships.

Early life 

Reuter was born in Guben into a Prussian military family. His father, a colonel in the army, was killed in the Franco-Prussian War. In 1885, he became a cadet in the Imperial German Navy at the instigation of his mother. As a midshipman at the age of 17, he was promoted to Unterleutnant zur See in 1888. By 1910, he was a Kapitän zur See, commanding the armored cruiser .

World War I 

Two months after the outbreak of World War I, he was made captain of the battlecruiser , which he also commanded during the Battle of Dogger Bank. In September 1915, he became commodore and commanding officer of the Fourth Scouting Group of five light cruisers, leading the group during the Battle of Jutland. Promoted to Konteradmiral in November 1916, he was placed in command of the Second Reconnaissance Group, a fleet of six light cruisers including his flagship . He commanded the group during the mine sweeping operation that led to the Second Battle of Heligoland Bight in November 1917. Reuter was appointed commander, Reconnaissance Forces and I Scouting Group in August 1918, succeeding Franz von Hipper.

Scuttling of the German High Seas Fleet at Scapa Flow

After the armistice that ended World War I, Konteradmiral von Reuter was requested to take command of the fleet that was to be interned at Scapa Flow until its final disposition would be decided at Versailles. Admiral Franz von Hipper, commander-in-chief of the High Seas Fleet, had refused to lead his ships into internment. He thus protested against the seizing of the fleet by Britain and its relocation to a British war harbour instead of a neutral location, as had been agreed initially.

As the final deadline neared for the German delegation to sign the Treaty of Versailles, Reuter anticipated that his ships would be handed over to the victorious Allies. To prevent this, he ordered all 74 ships scuttled on 21 June 1919, using an unusual flag signal previously agreed upon. Unbeknownst to the British, all ships had long ago been prepared for this action. Within five hours, 10 battleships, five battlecruisers, five light cruisers, and 32 destroyers sank in Scapa Flow. Only four destroyers remained afloat. Nine Germans were killed by British soldiers either aboard some of the ships (including Walter Schumann, the captain of ) or some of their lifeboats, while flying a white flag – the last German war deaths of World War I.

Reuter was vilified in Britain and made a prisoner of war, along with the other 1,773 officers and men of the fleet's remaining rump crews. In Germany, he was celebrated as a hero who had protected the honour of the navy. While most of the imprisoned Germans were soon returned to Germany, Reuter was among several who remained imprisoned in Britain. He was eventually released and finally returned to Germany in late January 1920.

Later life 

Five months after his return from Britain, Reuter was requested to hand in his resignation from the Navy. The Treaty of Versailles forced Germany to drastically reduce the size of its navy leaving Reuter without a suitable command, given his rank and age. Moving to Potsdam, he eventually became a state councillor. He also wrote a book on the scuttling of the High Fleet, Scapa Flow: Grave of the German Fleet. On 29 August 1939, he was made full admiral by Hitler to celebrate the 25th anniversary of the Battle of Tannenberg.

Death

Reuter died in Potsdam of a heart attack on 18 December 1943.

Notes

References

External links 

 

1869 births
1943 deaths
German untitled nobility
Imperial German Navy admirals of World War I
People from the Province of Brandenburg
Admirals of the Kriegsmarine
German prisoners of war in World War I
World War I prisoners of war held by the United Kingdom
People from Guben
Counter admirals of the Imperial German Navy